A minister delegate is a minister in the Government of France in charge of a specific issue within a ministry. They are placed under the authority of a specific cabinet minister or that of the Prime Minister. According to protocol, a minister delegate ranks between a minister and a secretary of state.

Ministers delegate in the Castex government

Attached to the Prime Minister
 Marc Fesneau Minister delegate for Relations with Parliament and Citizen Participation, attached to the Prime Minister
 Élisabeth Moreno Minister delegate for Gender Equality, Diversity and Equal Opportunities, attached to the Prime Minister

Attached to the Minister for Europe and Foreign Affairs
 Franck Riester Minister delegate for Foreign Trade and Economic Attractiveness, attached to the Minister for Europe and Foreign Affairs

Attached to the Minister for Ecological Transition
 Emmanuelle Wargon Minister delegate for Housing, attached to the Minister for the Ecological Transition
 Jean-Baptiste Djebbari Minister delegate for Transport, attached to the Minister for the Ecological Transition

Attached to the Minister of National Education, Youth and Sport
 Roxana Maracineanu Minister delegate for Sport, attached to the Minister of National Education, Youth and Sport

Attached to the Minister of the Economy, Finance and the Recovery
 Gabriel Attal Minister delegate for Public Accounts, attached to the Minister of the Economy, Finance and the Recovery
 Agnès Pannier-Runacher Minister delegate for Industry, attached to the Minister of the Economy, Finance and the Recovery
 Alain Griset Minister delegate for Small and Medium-sized Enterprises, attached to the Minister of the Economy, Finance and the Recovery

Attached to the Minister for the Armed Forces
 Geneviève Darrieussecq Minister delegate for Remembrance and Veterans, attached to the Minister for the Armed Forces

Attached to the Minister of the Interior
 Marlène Schiappa Minister delegate for Citizenship, attached to the Minister of the Interior

Attached to the Minister of Labour, Employment and Economic Inclusion
 Brigitte Klinkert Minister delegate for Economic Inclusion, attached to the Minister of Labour, Employment and Economic Inclusion

Attached to the Minister for Territorial Cohesion and Relations with Local Government
 Nadia Hai Minister delegate for Urban Affairs, attached to the Minister for Territorial Cohesion and Relations with Local Government

Attached to the Minister for Solidarity and Health
 Brigitte Bourguignon Minister delegate for Personal Independence, attached to the Minister for Solidarity and Health

See also
 Minister (government)
 Government of France
 Prime Minister of France

References

External links
 How French Government works
 A Short Guide to the French Political System

State ministers
Executive ministers
Government ministers